Hunhua Shan, also named Lincang Daxueshan 临沧大雪山, is a high mountain in Yunnan, China. It is located east of China National Highway 323, about 15 km to the northeast of Lincang.

With a height of 3,420 m and a prominence of 1,718 m, the Hunhua Shan is one of the ultra prominent peaks of Southeast Asia.

See also
List of mountains in China
List of Ultras of Southeast Asia
List of peaks by prominence

References

External links
Google Books, The Physical Geography of Southeast Asia
List of Mountains in Yunnan

Mountains of Yunnan
Geography of Lincang